Phoberus aculeatus is a species of hide beetle in the subfamily Troginae. The beetle species lives in South Africa.

References

aculeatus
Beetles described in 1872